Elmwood is an unincorporated community located at the junction of U.S Routes 270 and 412 in Beaver County, Oklahoma, United States. The Post Office was opened January 26, 1888.

References

Unincorporated communities in Beaver County, Oklahoma
Unincorporated communities in Oklahoma
Oklahoma Panhandle